Cymindis corax is a species of ground beetle in the subfamily Harpalinae. It was described by Reitter in 1889.

References

corax
Beetles described in 1889